Aninoasa is a town in Hunedoara County, Romania.

Aninoasa also may refer to the following Romanian places:

Aninoasa, Argeș, commune
Aninoasa, Dâmbovița, commune
Aninoasa, Gorj, commune
Aninoasa, a village in Reci Commune, Covasna County
Aninoasa, a village in Glăvile Commune, Vâlcea County
 Aninoasa, a tributary of the Călinești in Vâlcea County
 Aninoasa (Dâmbovița), a tributary of the Dâmbovița in Dâmbovița County
 Aninoasa, a tributary of the Jiul de Vest in Hunedoara County
 Aninoasa (Olt), a tributary of the Olt in Vâlcea County
 Aninoasa, a tributary of the Olteț in Vâlcea County